= Pubescent =

The adjective pubescent may describe:

- people or animals undergoing puberty
- plants that are hairy, covered in trichomes
- insects that are covered in setae
